Roberto Procel (born 20 July 1939) is a Mexican athlete. He competed in the men's long jump at the 1960 Summer Olympics.

References

1939 births
Living people
Athletes (track and field) at the 1959 Pan American Games
Athletes (track and field) at the 1960 Summer Olympics
Athletes (track and field) at the 1963 Pan American Games
Mexican male long jumpers
Olympic athletes of Mexico
Place of birth missing (living people)
Central American and Caribbean Games medalists in athletics
Pan American Games competitors for Mexico